Compsoglypha is a genus of beetles in the family Buprestidae, containing the following species:

 Compsoglypha nigrocaerulea Bellamy, 2006
 Compsoglypha perrieri Fairmaire, 1904

References

Buprestidae genera